South Silver Lake is an unincorporated community in Rich Valley Township, McLeod County, Minnesota, United States, near Silver Lake along Iris Road.

References

Unincorporated communities in McLeod County, Minnesota
Unincorporated communities in Minnesota